= Homage to Newton =

1985 sculpture by Salvador Dali in Singapore

- The sculpture in 2011
- Location: 1.28528°N 103.85105°E

Homage to Newton is a 1985 bronze sculpture by Salvador Dali, installed in Singapore. It is installed in the atrium outside UOB Plaza. Time Out Singapore has described the work as "a testament to Dali's boundless creativity and fascination with the concept of gravity".
